Carlo Salsa (Alessandria, 1893 – Milan, 4 March 1962) was a Military Officer, Italian journalist, writer and screenwriter.

Selected filmography
 The King's Jester (1941)

References

External links

1893 births
1962 deaths
Military personnel from Milan
Journalists from Milan
Italian male journalists
20th-century Italian screenwriters
Italian male screenwriters
20th-century Italian journalists
Film people from Milan
20th-century Italian male writers